Muromtsevo is the name of several inhabited localities in Russia.

Urban localities
Muromtsevo, Omsk Oblast, a work settlement in Muromtsevsky District of Omsk Oblast

Rural localities
Muromtsevo, Kaluga Oblast, a selo in Babyninsky District of Kaluga Oblast
Muromtsevo, Lipetsk Oblast, a village in Preobrazhensky Selsoviet of Izmalkovsky District of Lipetsk Oblast
Muromtsevo, Volokolamsky District, Moscow Oblast, a village under the administrative jurisdiction of the Town of Volokolamsk in Volokolamsky District of Moscow Oblast
Muromtsevo, Voskresensky District, Moscow Oblast, a village in Fedinskoye Rural Settlement of Voskresensky District of Moscow Oblast
Muromtsevo, Oryol Oblast, a village in Nikitinsky Selsoviet of Novoderevenkovsky District of Oryol Oblast
Muromtsevo, Vladimir Oblast, a settlement in Sudogodsky District of Vladimir Oblast

Renamed localities
Muromtsevo, name of Krasnoarmeysk, a town in Moscow Oblast, before 1928